Orain is a commune in the Côte-d'Or department in eastern France.

Population

Personalities
Jean Thurel, the "oldest soldier of Europe", was born in Orain in 1698.

See also
Communes of the Côte-d'Or department

References

Communes of Côte-d'Or